Notman Bridge is a historic concrete arch bridge over the Ausable River at Keene Valley in Essex County, New York.  It was built in 1913 and is an arch bridge faced with stone, 16 feet wide and spanning 62 feet, 6 inches at roughly 14 feet above water level.  The bridge is privately owned and access is through the Keene Valley Country Club.

It was listed on the National Register of Historic Places in 1999.

References

Road bridges on the National Register of Historic Places in New York (state)
Bridges completed in 1913
Bridges in Essex County, New York
1913 establishments in New York (state)
National Register of Historic Places in Essex County, New York
Arch bridges in the United States
Concrete bridges in the United States